Laws is a surname. Notable people with the surname include:

 Bolitha James Laws (1891–1958), United States federal judge
 Brian Laws, (born 1961) English football manager and former player
 David Laws (born 1965), British politician
 David Laws (rugby league), rugby union and rugby league footballer of the 1980s in Great Britain
 Don Laws (1929–2014), American figure skater and coach
 Eloise Laws (born 1943), American jazz and R&B singer
 George Malcolm Laws (1919–1994), American folklorist
 Gilbert L. Laws (1838–1907), American politician, newspaper publisher and businessman
 John Laws (born 1935), Australian radio presenter
 John Laws (judge) (born 1945), British retired judge
 Johnny Laws (born 1943), American Chicago blues guitarist, singer and songwriter
 Maury Laws (born 1923), American television and film score composer
 Michael Laws (born 1957), New Zealand politician, broadcaster, writer and columnist
 Priscilla Laws (born 1940), American physicist
 Richard Laws (1926–2014), British marine biologist, Master of St Edmund's College, Cambridge
 Robert Laws (1851–1934), Scottish missionary in the Nyasaland Protectorate (now Malawi)
 Robert E. Laws (1921–1990), American World War II soldier awarded the Medal of Honor 
 Sharon Laws (1974–2017), British cyclist and environmental consultant
 Stephen Laws, British lawyer and civil servant, First Parliamentary Counsel (2006–2012)

See also
Law (surname)

English-language surnames
Surnames of English origin
Patronymic surnames